The 2013 International GT Open season was the eighth season of the International GT Open, the grand tourer-style sports car racing founded in 2006 by the Spanish GT Sport Organización. It began on 27 April at Le Castellet and finished on 10 November, at Barcelona after eight double-header meetings.

The season was won by Scuderia Villorba Corse driver Andrea Montermini, who raced on the Ferrari F458 GT Italia. He also won the Super GT standings. Giorgio Pantano, who raced behind the wheel of Bhai Tech Racing's McLaren MP4-12C GT3 won the GTS class.

Entry list
On 23 April 2013, was released the provisional entry list for the first round at Paul Ricard.

Race calendar and results

Championship standings
Scoring system

Drivers' Championship

Super GT

GTS

Teams' Championship

Super GT

GTS

Manufacturers' Championship

Super GT

GTS

References

External links
Official website

International GT Open
International GT Open seasons